Big Idea may refer to:

 Big Idea (marketing), a term in marketing and advertising for the guideline behind a brand's marketing campaign
 Big Idea (summer camp), an international Jewish summer camp in Israel
 Big Idea Entertainment, an American Christian computer animation production company best known for their CGI animated series VeggieTales
 "Big Idea", a song by AJR from their album Living Room
 The Big Idea (1917 film), a 1917 short comedy film starring Snub Pollard
 The Big Idea (1934 film), a 1934 short comedy film starring Ted Healy and His Three Stooges
 The Big Idea (American TV series), a 1953–54 TV show on science that aired on the DuMont network
 The Big Idea (UK TV series), a 2006 British reality television series that aired on Sky One
 The Big Idea with Donny Deutsch, an American talk show
 The Big Idea (game), a marketing game produced by Cheapass Games
 The Big Idea (museum) (2000-2003), a Scottish museum celebrating invention in Irvine, North Ayrshire

See also
 Big Ideas (disambiguation)